Abiff is a small community in Dickson County, Tennessee, United States, about  west of Nashville.  In 2020, it had a population of 6,910, according to the census..

References

Encyclopædia Britannica World Atlas, 1959 Edition, p. 298.

Unincorporated communities in Dickson County, Tennessee
Unincorporated communities in Tennessee